Skop may refer to:

 Skop (food), or inyama yenhloko, an African dish made of cow, goat, or sheep's head
 Skop (village), a village in Warmian-Masurian Voivodeship, Poland
 Skop (Dr. Slump), a character in the manga Dr. Slump
 Marko Škop (born 1974), Slovak film director

See also
 Scop (disambiguation)